Rosalind Audrey Clare Hudson (née Latham; 31 July 1926 – 7 July 2013) was a British codebreaker and architectural model maker.

Early life
Rosalind was educated at Adcote School, Shropshire. In her early years she developed a love for architecture. Being the granddaughter of Walter Aubrey Thomas, who designed the Royal Liver Building, Hudson also constructed architectural models. Hudson attempted to further her career in architecture at the Liverpool School of Art, but she eventually dropped out during World War II to join the Women's Royal Naval Service. Hudson was stationed in Bletchley Park and Woburn Abbey for the duration of the war.

Career

Bletchley Park
Following training in the WRNS she was sent to Bletchley Park, home of the British government's the Government Code and Cypher School. Hudson worked in Hut 8 under cryptanalyst Alan Turing. She never discussed her work at Bletchley Park following the war.

Florist
After the war Hudson trained as a florist under Constance Spry, and arranged flowers at Claridge's and the Savoy hotels. The Savoy gave her and her husband a suite overlooking the River Thames as a wedding present. Hudson worked as a florist for Somerset Maugham and his wife, the interior designer Syrie Maugham, and was an amateur pianist and watercolorist.

Architectural models
Hudson was most notable for her architectural models, being particularly attracted to Georgian architecture. Bath's Building of Bath Collection and Bath's Pump Room contain models made by Hudson. A scale model of Dulwich Picture Gallery made by Hudson stands in the gallery's foyer. Hudson made a model of Highgrove, the country house of Charles, Prince of Wales as a present for the Prince and Princess of Wales's wedding in 1981. Hudson was later commissioned by Charles to alter the model when he added a porch to the house. Hudson made models of other private houses, and was reluctant to accept payment for her models.

Personal life
She met her husband, Richard Hudson in 1945. Hudson was serving in the Royal Marines, they married in 1949. She was survived by her husband and their three sons and two daughters; they lived on a farm near Bath.

She died in 2013, shortly before her 87th birthday.

References

1926 births
2013 deaths
Florists
British women in World War II
Women's Royal Naval Service ratings
Bletchley Park people
Scale modeling
Bletchley Park women
Women's Royal Naval Service personnel of World War II